NewSpring Church is a Baptist Evangelical multi-site megachurch based in Anderson, South Carolina, affiliated with the Southern Baptist Convention.

History 
The church was founded in January 2000 with a handful of people in a living room. Since then, it has grown to 14 locations across the state of South Carolina. In addition to gathering at multiple campuses across the state, NewSpring has established an online campus to connect with individuals who cannot join in person.

According to a church census released in 2016, it claimed a weekly attendance of 33,761 people. 

Announced July 10, 2016, founder Perry Noble was removed as Senior Pastor by the church's leadership team effective July 1, 2016 for personal issues related to alcohol and neglect of his family.

A year later it was announced that NewSpring would be led by a team of Lead Pastors (Brad Cooper, Shane Duffey, Michael Mullikin, Tyler Tatum, David Hall, Lee McDerment, and Riley Cummings) and Teaching Pastors (Brad Cooper, Clayton King, Dan Lian, and Meredith Knox, along with many other staff members) would share the stage on Sundays. The church also instituted a team of elders composed of a group of members from different NewSpring campuses.

In 2022 the church was $6.3 million in debt, reduced from $47 million in 2016.

Beliefs 
The Church has a Baptist confession of faith and is a member of the Southern Baptist Convention.

Ministries 
NewSpring has many ministries within in the church. Here is a list of active ministries of NewSpring Church.

 KidSpring (Children's Ministry) 
 [FUSE] (Student Ministry) 
 NewSpring Worship (Worship Ministry) 
 NewSpring Missions (Missions)

NewSpring Worship

NewSpring Worship are an American Christian music worship group from Anderson, South Carolina, established in 2016 at NewSpring Church. They have released one extended play, Difference Maker in 2016 with Dream Worship. They are based out of NewSpring Church. They play worship music for the congregation at their services.

The group began recording in 2016, with the extended play, Difference Maker, that was released on February 5, 2016, from Dream Worship.

They have one published EP:
Difference Maker (February 5, 2016, Dream Worship)

Locations 
The church is headquartered in Anderson, which is the base of all teaching and also houses the NewSpring Church Support Center. It operates satellite campuses in 13 other South Carolina cities.

See also 
 List of megachurches in the United States
 Megachurch

References

External links 
 NewSpring Church website
 Baptist Courier

Churches in South Carolina
Evangelical megachurches in the United States
Baptist multisite churches
2000 establishments in South Carolina
Southern Baptist Convention churches